The 1931 Balkan Cup was an unofficial holding of the competition in which only three teams participated - Bulgaria, Yugoslavia and Turkey. It was played in 30 September – 4 October 1931 (i.e. before the 1929–31 tournament had been completed) and was won by Bulgaria. It featured three matches, all played in Stadion Slavia, Sofia.

Final standings

Matches

Winner

Statistics

Goalscorers

References

1931
1931–32 in European football
1930–31 in Turkish football
1930–31 in Bulgarian football
1930–31 in Yugoslav football